The 1983–84 Philadelphia Flyers season was the Flyers' 17th season in the National Hockey League (NHL). During the final season of the playing careers of Hockey Hall of Famers Bill Barber and Bobby Clarke, the Flyers lost in the first round of the playoffs to the Washington Capitals in a three-game sweep.

Off-season
Bob McCammon replaced Keith Allen as general manager in the off-season, and retained his position as head coach. McCammon had received an offer from the Pittsburgh Penguins to become their general manager.

Regular season
The youth of the team began to take over the reins from the old guard as Tim Kerr recorded his first 50-goal season. The team finished in third place.

The 1983–84 regular season saw Barber play his final games as he would officially announce his retirement following the next season after being unable to return from reconstructive knee surgery.

Season standings

Playoffs
The Flyers were swept in three games for the second consecutive season, this time by the Washington Capitals.

After the loss, Flyers President Jay Snider informed Bob McCammon he could no longer continue as head coach. As GM, McCammon disagreed a change was needed, so he resigned from both positions altogether on April 25. On May 15, Bobby Clarke retired from playing and was named vice president and general manager of the team.

Schedule and results

Regular season

|- style="background:#cfc;"
| 1 || October 6 || Washington Capitals || 4–1 || 1–0–0 || 2 || 
|- style="background:#cfc;"
| 2 || October 8 || @ Montreal Canadiens || 6–3 || 2–0–0 || 4 || 
|- style="background:#cfc;"
| 3 || October 9 || Pittsburgh Penguins || 7–1 || 3–0–0 || 6 || 
|- style="background:#cfc;"
| 4 || October 13 || Winnipeg Jets || 4–3 || 4–0–0 || 8 || 
|- style="background:#cfc;"
| 5 || October 15 || @ New York Islanders || 5–1 || 5–0–0 || 10 || 
|- style="background:#fcf;"
| 6 || October 16 || @ New York Rangers || 4–5 || 5–1–0 || 10 || 
|- style="background:#ffc;"
| 7 || October 20 || Boston Bruins || 3–3 OT || 5–1–1 || 11 || 
|- style="background:#fcf;"
| 8 || October 22 || @ Washington Capitals || 1–4 || 5–2–1 || 11 || 
|- style="background:#cfc;"
| 9 || October 23 || Toronto Maple Leafs || 8–5 || 6–2–1 || 13 || 
|- style="background:#cfc;"
| 10 || October 25 || @ Quebec Nordiques || 4–2 || 7–2–1 || 15 || 
|- style="background:#cfc;"
| 11 || October 27 || Quebec Nordiques || 4–3 || 8–2–1 || 17 || 
|- style="background:#cfc;"
| 12 || October 29 || @ Pittsburgh Penguins || 3–1 || 9–2–1 || 19 || 
|- style="background:#fcf;"
| 13 || October 30 || New York Islanders || 2–6 || 9–3–1 || 19 || 
|-

|- style="background:#fcf;"
| 14 || November 3 || Los Angeles Kings || 5–6 || 9–4–1 || 19 || 
|- style="background:#fcf;"
| 15 || November 5 || @ St. Louis Blues || 6–7 || 9–5–1 || 19 || 
|- style="background:#cfc;"
| 16 || November 6 || Hartford Whalers || 4–2 || 10–5–1 || 21 || 
|- style="background:#fcf;"
| 17 || November 8 || @ New York Islanders || 1–4 || 10–6–1 || 21 || 
|- style="background:#cfc;"
| 18 || November 12 || @ Toronto Maple Leafs || 5–3 || 11–6–1 || 23 || 
|- style="background:#fcf;"
| 19 || November 13 || @ Winnipeg Jets || 2–3 || 11–7–1 || 23 || 
|- style="background:#ffc;"
| 20 || November 17 || Minnesota North Stars || 5–5 OT || 11–7–2 || 24 || 
|- style="background:#cfc;"
| 21 || November 20 || Pittsburgh Penguins || 5–4 OT || 12–7–2 || 26 || 
|- style="background:#fcf;"
| 22 || November 23 || New York Islanders || 2–4 || 12–8–2 || 26 || 
|- style="background:#cfc;"
| 23 || November 26 || @ Vancouver Canucks || 5–4 || 13–8–2 || 28 || 
|- style="background:#cfc;"
| 24 || November 29 || @ Calgary Flames || 8–5 || 14–8–2 || 30 || 
|- style="background:#ffc;"
| 25 || November 30 || @ Edmonton Oilers || 3–3 OT || 14–8–3 || 31 || 
|-

|- style="background:#cfc;"
| 26 || December 3 || @ Pittsburgh Penguins || 6–3 || 15–8–3 || 33 || 
|- style="background:#fcf;"
| 27 || December 4 || Hartford Whalers || 5–6 || 15–9–3 || 33 || 
|- style="background:#cfc;"
| 28 || December 8 || Chicago Black Hawks || 3–2 || 16–9–3 || 35 || 
|- style="background:#cfc;"
| 29 || December 10 || @ New Jersey Devils || 8–2 || 17–9–3 || 37 || 
|- style="background:#fcf;"
| 30 || December 11 || Buffalo Sabres || 5–6 || 17–10–3 || 37 || 
|- style="background:#cfc;"
| 31 || December 15 || Washington Capitals || 9–4 || 18–10–3 || 39 || 
|- style="background:#ffc;"
| 32 || December 17 || @ Detroit Red Wings || 3–3 OT || 18–10–4 || 40 || 
|- style="background:#ffc;"
| 33 || December 18 || Detroit Red Wings || 3–3 OT || 18–10–5 || 41 || 
|- style="background:#ffc;"
| 34 || December 21 || @ Chicago Black Hawks || 3–3 OT || 18–10–6 || 42 || 
|- style="background:#cfc;"
| 35 || December 22 || New Jersey Devils || 5–0 || 19–10–6 || 44 || 
|- style="background:#cfc;"
| 36 || December 26 || @ Washington Capitals || 5–4 || 20–10–6 || 46 || 
|- style="background:#fcf;"
| 37 || December 30 || @ New York Rangers || 3–6 || 20–11–6 || 46 || 
|-

|- style="background:#cfc;"
| 38 || January 3 || @ Pittsburgh Penguins || 7–5 || 21–11–6 || 48 || 
|- style="background:#cfc;"
| 39 || January 5 || Winnipeg Jets || 7–6 OT || 22–11–6 || 50 || 
|- style="background:#cfc;"
| 40 || January 7 || @ Detroit Red Wings || 8–4 || 23–11–6 || 52 || 
|- style="background:#fcf;"
| 41 || January 8 || Washington Capitals || 1–7 || 23–12–6 || 52 || 
|- style="background:#fcf;"
| 42 || January 11 || @ Buffalo Sabres || 2–6 || 23–13–6 || 52 || 
|- style="background:#fcf;"
| 43 || January 12 || New York Rangers || 1–2 || 23–14–6 || 52 || 
|- style="background:#ffc;"
| 44 || January 14 || @ Quebec Nordiques || 3–3 OT || 23–14–7 || 53 || 
|- style="background:#cfc;"
| 45 || January 17 || @ Montreal Canadiens || 6–4 || 24–14–7 || 55 || 
|- style="background:#cfc;"
| 46 || January 19 || New Jersey Devils || 2–0 || 25–14–7 || 57 || 
|- style="background:#cfc;"
| 47 || January 21 || New York Islanders || 7–1 || 26–14–7 || 59 || 
|- style="background:#cfc;"
| 48 || January 25 || @ Los Angeles Kings || 5–2 || 27–14–7 || 61 || 
|- style="background:#fcf;"
| 49 || January 27 || @ Vancouver Canucks || 0–4 || 27–15–7 || 61 || 
|- style="background:#ffc;"
| 50 || January 29 || @ Chicago Black Hawks || 5–5 OT || 27–15–8 || 62 || 
|-

|- style="background:#ffc;"
| 51 || February 2 || Montreal Canadiens || 2–2 OT || 27–15–9 || 63 || 
|- style="background:#fcf;"
| 52 || February 4 || @ Boston Bruins || 5–8 || 27–16–9 || 63 || 
|- style="background:#cfc;"
| 53 || February 5 || Toronto Maple Leafs || 7–0 || 28–16–9 || 65 || 
|- style="background:#cfc;"
| 54 || February 9 || Edmonton Oilers || 4–3 || 29–16–9 || 67 || 
|- style="background:#fcf;"
| 55 || February 11 || @ Washington Capitals || 3–6 || 29–17–9 || 67 || 
|- style="background:#fcf;"
| 56 || February 12 || Vancouver Canucks || 5–6 || 29–18–9 || 67 || 
|- style="background:#cfc;"
| 57 || February 16 || St. Louis Blues || 5–2 || 30–18–9 || 69 || 
|- style="background:#cfc;"
| 58 || February 18 || New Jersey Devils || 4–3 || 31–18–9 || 71 || 
|- style="background:#cfc;"
| 59 || February 19 || @ New York Rangers || 3–2 OT || 32–18–9 || 73 || 
|- style="background:#fcf;"
| 60 || February 21 || Buffalo Sabres || 4–5 OT || 32–19–9 || 73 || 
|- style="background:#ffc;"
| 61 || February 23 || Minnesota North Stars || 3–3 OT || 32–19–10 || 74 || 
|- style="background:#fcf;"
| 62 || February 25 || @ Hartford Whalers || 7–9 || 32–20–10 || 74 || 
|- style="background:#cfc;"
| 63 || February 26 || New York Islanders || 5–3 || 33–20–10 || 76 || 
|- style="background:#cfc;"
| 64 || February 29 || @ Edmonton Oilers || 5–3 || 34–20–10 || 78 || 
|-

|- style="background:#fcf;"
| 65 || March 1 || @ Calgary Flames || 1–5 || 34–21–10 || 78 || 
|- style="background:#fcf;"
| 66 || March 3 || @ St. Louis Blues || 3–4 || 34–22–10 || 78 || 
|- style="background:#fcf;"
| 67 || March 6 || @ New York Islanders || 2–5 || 34–23–10 || 78 || 
|- style="background:#cfc;"
| 68 || March 8 || Los Angeles Kings || 4–1 || 35–23–10 || 80 || 
|- style="background:#fcf;"
| 69 || March 10 || @ Minnesota North Stars || 3–4 || 35–24–10 || 80 || 
|- style="background:#cfc;"
| 70 || March 11 || Calgary Flames || 3–2 || 36–24–10 || 82 || 
|- style="background:#fcf;"
| 71 || March 14 || @ New York Rangers || 3–6 || 36–25–10 || 82 || 
|- style="background:#cfc;"
| 72 || March 15 || Boston Bruins || 6–3 || 37–25–10 || 84 || 
|- style="background:#cfc;"
| 73 || March 17 || New York Rangers || 6–4 || 38–25–10 || 86 || 
|- style="background:#cfc;"
| 74 || March 19 || @ New Jersey Devils || 4–3 || 39–25–10 || 88 || 
|- style="background:#cfc;"
| 75 || March 22 || Pittsburgh Penguins || 13–4 || 40–25–10 || 90 || 
|- style="background:#cfc;"
| 76 || March 24 || New York Rangers || 6–5 || 41–25–10 || 92 || 
|- style="background:#cfc;"
| 77 || March 25 || New Jersey Devils || 4–1 || 42–25–10 || 94 || 
|- style="background:#cfc;"
| 78 || March 28 || @ Pittsburgh Penguins || 5–3 || 43–25–10 || 96 || 
|- style="background:#cfc;"
| 79 || March 30 || @ New Jersey Devils || 6–2 || 44–25–10 || 98 || 
|-

|- style="background:#fcf;"
| 80 || April 1 || Washington Capitals || 1–4 || 44–26–10 || 98 || 
|-

|-
| Legend:

Playoffs

|- style="background:#fcf;"
| 1 || April 4 || @ Washington Capitals || 2–4 || Capitals lead 1–0 || 
|- style="background:#fcf;"
| 2 || April 5 || @ Washington Capitals || 2–6 || Capitals lead 2–0 || 
|- style="background:#fcf;"
| 3 || April 7 || Washington Capitals || 1–5 || Capitals win 3–0 || 
|-

|-
| Legend:

Player statistics

Scoring
 Position abbreviations: C = Center; D = Defense; G = Goaltender; LW = Left Wing; RW = Right Wing
  = Joined team via a transaction (e.g., trade, waivers, signing) during the season. Stats reflect time with the Flyers only.
  = Left team via a transaction (e.g., trade, waivers, release) during the season. Stats reflect time with the Flyers only.

Goaltending

Awards and records

Awards

Records

Among the team records set during the 1983–84 season was the franchise high 350 goals scored on the season. On December 15 against the Washington Capitals, the Flyers scored three shorthanded goals during the game (tied for the team record) and three during the second period. On March 22 against the Pittsburgh Penguins, the Flyers scored 13 goals, a franchise high which was tied seven months later. 1984 was the final year of Bobby Clarke’s team record twelve consecutive years in the playoffs streak dating back to 1973.

The 1983–84 season was the final NHL seasons for three longtime Flyers — Clarke, Bill Barber, and Rick MacLeish — who hold several career records for the team. Clarke holds the regular season marks for seasons played (15, tied with Claude Giroux), games played (1,144), assists (852), and points (1,210). Clarke also holds the playoff marks for seasons played (13), games played (136), assists (77), and points (119). Barber holds the regular season mark for goals scored (420) and is tied for the playoff mark for goals scored (53) with MacLeish.

Milestones

Franchise firsts

Individual

Transactions
The Flyers were involved in the following transactions from May 18, 1983, the day after the deciding game of the 1983 Stanley Cup Finals, through May 19, 1984, the day of the deciding game of the 1984 Stanley Cup Finals.

Trades

Players acquired

Players lost

Signings

Draft picks

Philadelphia's picks at the 1983 NHL Entry Draft, which was held at the Montreal Forum in Montreal, Quebec, on June 8, 1983.

Farm teams
The Flyers were affiliated with the Springfield Indians of the AHL and the Toledo Goaldiggers of the IHL.

Notes

References
General
 
 
 
Specific

Philadelphia Flyers seasons
Philadelphia
Philadelphia
Philadelphia
Philadelphia